Charaxes northcotti, Northcott's charaxes, is a butterfly in the family Nymphalidae. It is found in Guinea, Burkina Faso, northern Ivory Coast, Ghana and Nigeria. The habitat consists of dense woodland savanna and gallery forests. It is uncommon.

Description
Ch. northcotti Rothsch. male: wings above black; hindwing behind the apex of the cell between veins 2 and 6 with a blue transverse band 8 mm. in breadth, which at veins 2—5 is united with the thick blue marginal lunules and hence encloses black, white-pupilled submarginal spots; forewing above with large blue marginal spots, only separated by the black veins, and 3 mm. from the distal margin with a row of 8 blue (or at the costal margin white) submarginal spots, of which the last two (in la and lb) are more or less united to the marginal spots; in the basal part of cellules 2—6 and in the apex of the cell there are also blue spots. Under surface coloured and marked as in ethalion. Female unknown. Ashanti.

Taxonomy
Charaxes northcotti is a member of the large species group Charaxes etheocles.

References

Victor Gurney Logan Van Someren, 1969 Revisional notes on African Charaxes (Lepidoptera: Nymphalidae). Part V. Bulletin of the British Museum (Natural History) (Entomology)75-166.

External links
Charaxes northcotti images at Consortium for the Barcode of Life

Butterflies described in 1899
northcotti
Butterflies of Africa
Taxa named by Walter Rothschild